Nielsen RingScan is a weekly point-of-sale tracking service of ringtones and is offered by Nielsen Mobile, a division of a Nielsen Entertainment. RingScan currently reports on polyphonic, master and voice ringtones and will expand to include ringbacks and other types of ringtones. RingScan is utilized as the source material for Billboard Magazine's weekly ringtone charts.

How Nielsen RingScan tracks sales
Full sales data is collected weekly from point-of-sale retailers, being mobile carriers and direct-to-consumer companies. The data is aggregated to produce sales reports for each market represented in RingScan.

Top Selling Ringtones

See also
 Nielsen SoundScan
 Billboard Hot RingMasters
 Billboard Hot Ringtones
 The Nielsen Company

References

External links
 USA Today article: Mastertones ring up profits
 Preview & download new ringtone mp3 free for mobiles

Mobile software
Mobile phone culture